Peter of Saint Joseph de Betancur (or Betancourt) y Gonzáles, OFB (March 21, 1626– April 25, 1667), also called Hermano Pedro de San José Betancurt (Brother Peter of Saint Joseph Betancur) or more simply Peter de Betancurt,  Hermano Pedro (Brother Peter), Santo Hermano Pedro (Saint Brother Peter), or San Pedro de Vilaflor (Saint Peter of Vilaflor), was a Spanish saint and missionary in Guatemala. 

Known as the "Saint Francis of Assisi of the Americas", he is the first saint native to the Canary Islands, is also considered the first saint of Guatemala and Central America for having done his missionary work in those American lands. He was the founder of Order of Our Lady of Bethlehem.

Biography 
Betancourt was born at Vilaflor on the Island of Tenerife in 1626, one of the five children of Amador Betancourt, a descendant of Jean de Béthencourt, the French knight and explorer who conquered the Canary Islands for King Henry III of Castile (1402-1405), and of Ana Gonzáles Betancurt. It has recently been discovered that he also had Canarian aboriginal ancestors (Guanches). As a small child, he worked as a shepherd, caring for his family's small flock, their only source of income, but also spending some time praying in small cave in the arid region near the present-day town of El Médano (municipality of Granadilla de Abona). When the father's estate was seized by a moneylender in 1638 for failure to pay the family's debt, Betancourt was indentured to his service in recompense for the monies still due him. During this period, his eldest brother, Mateo, migrated to Spain's colonies in the New World, possibly settling in Ecuador.

Of his life in Tenerife there are some anecdotal data, such as his stay in the famous cave that bears his name, located in El Médano in the south of the island, which Betancourt used as a refuge with his cattle during the winter, as a place of prayer and even as a hiding place to shelter from a pirate raid, so abundant on the Canary Islands coast in that time.

In 1649, at age 23, Betancourt was freed from his period of servitude and decided to follow his brother's example. He set sail for Guatemala, the capital of the Kingdom of Guatemala, in hopes of connecting with a relative engaged in government service there. He sailed to America leaving from the port of Santa Cruz de Tenerife. It is believed that Pedro, before leaving Tenerife, prayed in the Church of San Francisco de Asís in Santa Cruz de Tenerife, because this was the church of the port of the city and was frequented by those who were going to travel to America.

By the time he had reached Havana, Cuba, he was out of money. He then spent a year serving a priest there who was also from Tenerife. He had to pay for his passage from that point by working on a ship which docked at Honduras from where he walked to Antigua Guatemala. When he arrived in La Antigua Guatemala, he was so destitute that he joined the bread line which the Franciscan friars had established to feed the poor. Eventually he found his uncle who then found him a job in a local textile factory.

In 1653 Betancourt enrolled in the Jesuit College of San Borgia to study for priesthood. When after three years he could not master the material, he withdrew from the school and abandoned this idea. After holding the position of sacristan for a while in a church dedicated to the Blessed Virgin, he rented a house in a suburb of the city called Calvary, and there taught reading and catechism to poor children.

Unable to receive holy orders, Betancourt became a Franciscan tertiary at the Franciscan friary of Costa Rica in Antigua Guatemala, and adopted the religious name of Peter of Saint Joseph. He visited hospitals, jails, the unemployed and worked with the young. In 1658 Betancourt was given a hut which he converted into a hospital for the poor who had been discharged from the city hospital but still needed to convalesce. His zeal elicited benefactions from those around him and the bishop and governor supplied him with all the conveniences he required.

Three years later several individuals provided for the purchase of the houses surrounding the one Betancourt then occupied and on their site was erected a hospital in which he could better work. He himself worked with the masons. The hospital was thoroughly equipped and stocked. The institution, a hospital for the convalescent poor, was placed under the patronage of Our Lady of Bethlehem. Soon after there was a shelter for the homeless, a school for the poor, an oratory, and an inn for priests.

The Bethlehemites 

Betancourt was joined by other tertiaries. He personally trained his first assistants and had no wish to organize a community, but simply to establish his hospital. Soon, however, he wrote up an adaptation of the Rule of St. Augustine (although Betancourt was a Franciscan) for the community, which was also adopted by the women who were involved in teaching the children. This led to the formation of the Order of Our Lady of Bethlehem or Bethlemitas who tend to the sick. The men and women who joined his religious community also served in the two other hospitals of the city and Pedro continued to befriend poor children. The Bethlemite Order belongs to the Franciscan community.

Later years 
Prisoners also excited Betancourt's compassion. Every Thursday he begged for them through the city and visited them in their cells. He begged for alms to endow the Masses celebrated by poor priests and also endowed Masses to be celebrated in the early hours so that the poor might not miss Mass. The neglected souls in purgatory were also the objects of his solicitude. He would travel the streets at night ringing a bell and recommending these souls to be prayed for.

Betancourt died on April 25, 1667, at the age of forty-one, in Antigua Guatemala, exhausted by labor and penance. At the request of the Capuchin Friars he was buried in their church where, for a long time, his remains were held in veneration.

Betancourt devoted his life to helping those marginalized: lepers, prisoners, slaves and Indians and served as precursor of Human Rights.

Veneration 

Betancourt was distinguished by the humble spirit and austere life with which he practiced mercy.  
He was beatified on June 22, 1980, and canonized on July 30, 2002, by Pope John Paul II.  At the homily read by Pope John Paul in Guatemala City on July 30, 2002, Betancourt was called the "first Tenerifean and Guatemalan saint", and he "... personifies "a heritage which must not be lost; we should always be thankful for it and we should renew our resolve to imitate it".

The healing of a child with an intestinal lymphoma was taken by the Catholic Church as the miracle required for his canonization. The circumstance occurs that this child was precisely a native of Betancourt's native locality, Vilaflor. This apostolic journey of Pope John Paul II also included Canada and Mexico, the latter country where he canonized Juan Diego Cuauhtlatoatzin, a seer of the apparitions of the Virgin of Guadalupe in 1531.

Betancourt's tomb is in the San Francisco Church in Antigua Guatemala. The Cave of Santo Hermano Pedro is located in the south of the island of Tenerife, in a desert on the outskirts of the city of El Médano. It is a very popular pilgrimage site, where the faithful present votive offerings to Betancourt. Inside the cave is a wooden statue of Betancourt. Also an important place of veneration is the Sanctuary of the Santo Hermano Pedro, which is built on his birthplace in Vilaflor.

Its liturgical holiday is April 25, although it is usually moved to 24, because the 25 is celebrated to Mark the Evangelist. Apart from the April holiday, in Tenerife is also celebrated on June 29, coinciding with the feast of Peter the Apostle.

Legacy 
Betancourt is considered the great evangelist of the West Indies. He made a great social work comparable to that made centuries later by Mother Teresa in Calcutta, serving the most vulnerable and needy.

He is sometimes credited with introducing to the Americas, the Christmas Eve posadas procession, in which people representing Mary and Joseph seek a night's lodging from their neighbors. The custom soon spread to Mexico and other Central American countries.

Betancourt was known to work miracles also, some of them including healing sick people in under an hour. Also getting notes from deceased family members by setting rocks out and letting the member arrange them over time.

Among other facets of his life, his defense in the Immaculate Conception stand out two centuries before the declaration of said dogma, his devotion to the souls of Purgatory and his penances.

See also 
 Bethlehemite Brothers
 List of saints of the Canary Islands

References

External links

 Hermano Pedro de San José Betancurt (1626-1667)
 Canonización del Beato Hermano Pedro de San José de Betancurt
Website of the Obras Sociales Society with the biography of Pedro Betancur
Patron Saints Index: Peter of Saint Joseph Betancur

1626 births
1667 deaths
17th-century Christian saints
17th-century Spanish people
Beatifications by Pope John Paul II
Peter
Roman Catholic missionaries from the Canary Islands
Canonizations by Pope John Paul II
Canonized Roman Catholic religious brothers
Roman Catholic missionaries in New Spain
Roman Catholic missionaries in Guatemala
Founders of Catholic religious communities
Franciscan saints
Spanish hermits
Guatemalan Roman Catholic saints
People from Tenerife
Saints of the Canary Islands
Spanish Roman Catholic saints
Third Order of Saint Francis
Franciscan missionaries